Out & About may refer to:
 Out & About (newsletter), New York travel newsletter for gay and lesbian travelers
 Out & About Newspaper, a monthly LGBT newspaper in Nashville, Tennessee
 Out and About (Cherish the Ladies album), 1993 
 Out and About (Steve Swell album), 1996
 "Out and About", 1967 song by Boyce and Hart
 Out'n'About, American bed and breakfast company
 Out and About with the Gone Jackals, 1990 album by The Gone Jackals